This is a list of members of the Belgian Chamber of Representatives during the 54th legislature (2014–2019), arranged alphabetically.

The government majority during this legislature is formed by a coalition of N-VA, CD&V, Open Vld and MR, forming the Michel Government.

Election results (25 May 2014)

Bureau

Presidents

College of Quaestors

Group leaders

List of representatives

Sources
 
 
 
 

Belgian Chamber of Representatives
2010s in Belgium